Yasuj Airport  is an airport serving Yasuj, a city in the Zagros Mountains of southwestern Iran, and capital of the Kohgiluyeh and Boyer-Ahmad Province. The airport and the city are also known Yasouj.

Airlines and destinations

Accidents
On 18 February 2018, Iran Aseman Airlines Flight 3704 from Tehran Mehrabad International Airport to Yasuj crashed; all 65 passengers on board were presumed to be killed. Initial reports revealed that the aircraft collided into Mount Dena due to bad weather. The caused of the crash is currently under investigation.

References

External links 
 Aircraft photos at Yasouj ( YES / OISY ) from Airliners.net

Airports in Iran
Kohgiluyeh and Boyer-Ahmad Province